Lit or LIT may refer to:

Codes 
 lit, the ISO 639-2 code for the Lithuanian language

Education
 Lamar Institute of Technology, Beaumont, Texas, United States
 Laxminarayan Institute of Technology, Nagpur, India
 Lee-Ming Institute of Technology, New Taipei, Taiwan
 Limerick Institute of Technology, Limerick, Ireland

Music
 Lit (band), an American alternative rock band
Lit (album), by the above band
 "Lit" (Koda Kumi song)
 "Lit" (Steve Aoki and Yellow Claw song)
 "Lit" (Wiz Khalifa song)
 "Lit", 2019 song by Oneus
 Lit, EP album by Lay Zhang

Places
 Lit, Bhulath, India
 Lit, Sweden
 LIT Ranch, Texas, United States
 Lithuania, UNDP country code LIT

Transport
 Clinton National Airport, Arkansas, US, IATA code
 Littlehampton railway station, West Sussex, England, National Rail station code

Other uses
 Lit Brothers, a department store in Philadelphia, United States
 Lit Motors, an American cabin motorcycle developer
 LIT Verlag, a German publisher
 Lit Lounge, a New York night club
 LIT (video game)
 .lit, a filename extension for Microsoft Reader e-books
 Journal of Lambda Iota Tau honor society
 Linear ion trap in mass spectrometry
 &lit, a type of cryptic crossword clue
 An abbreviation for literature
 lit., an abbreviation for literal or literally, see Literal translation

See also
 Litt, a surname